Mary Anne Sewell (born 1963) is a New Zealand marine biology academic. She is currently a full professor at the University of Auckland.

Academic career

After a 1993 PhD titled  'Reproductive cycle, sex change, and mortality during brooding of a viviparous sea cucumber Leptosynapta clarki'  at the University of Alberta, she moved to the University of Auckland, rising to full professor.

Sewell has spoken publicly on a number of marine issues, including shark finning and microbeads and plastic pollution

Selected works 
 Levitan, Don R., Mary A. Sewell, and Fu-Shiang Chia. "How distribution and abundance influence fertilization success in the sea urchin Strongylocentotus franciscanus." Ecology 73, no. 1 (1992): 248–254.
 Fendall, Lisa S., and Mary A. Sewell. "Contributing to marine pollution by washing your face: microplastics in facial cleansers." Marine pollution bulletin 58, no. 8 (2009): 1225–1228.
 Hofmann, Gretchen E., James P. Barry, Peter J. Edmunds, Ruth D. Gates, David A. Hutchins, Terrie Klinger, and Mary A. Sewell. "The effect of ocean acidification on calcifying organisms in marine ecosystems: an organism-to-ecosystem perspective." Annual Review of Ecology, Evolution, and Systematics 41 (2010): 127–147.
 Levitan, Don R., Mary A. Sewell, and Fu-Shiang Chia. "Kinetics of fertilization in the sea urchin Strongylocentrotus franciscanus: interaction of gamete dilution, age, and contact time." The Biological Bulletin 181, no. 3 (1991): 371–378.
 O’Donnell, Michael J., Anne E. Todgham, Mary A. Sewell, LaTisha M. Hammond, Katya Ruggiero, Nann A. Fangue, Mackenzie L. Zippay, and Gretchen E. Hofmann. "Ocean acidification alters skeletogenesis and gene expression in larval sea urchins." Marine Ecology Progress Series 398 (2010): 157–171.

References

External links
  
 

Living people
New Zealand women academics
University of Alberta alumni
Academic staff of the University of Auckland
New Zealand marine biologists
1963 births